Peter Gamble (born 13 August 1937) is a Hong Kong sailor. He competed in the Flying Dutchman event at the 1968 Summer Olympics.

References

External links
 

1937 births
Living people
Hong Kong male sailors (sport)
Olympic sailors of Hong Kong
Sailors at the 1968 Summer Olympics – Flying Dutchman
Place of birth missing (living people)